Battle of Poznań can refer to:
Battle of Poznań (1704)
Battle of Poznań (1945)